Li Songyi (Chinese:李松益; Pinyin: Lǐ Sōngyì; born 27 January 1993) is a Chinese football player who currently plays as a defender for Kunshan.

Club career
After playing in the youth squad of Shandong Luneng Taishan, Li started his professional football career in 2011. He played for Shandong Youth (Shandong Luneng youth team) in the China League Two and made 14 appearances in the season. On 27 July, he scored his first league goal in a 3–1 home victory against Xi'an Laochenggen. Li was promoted to Shandong Luneng's first team squad by Henk ten Cate in 2012. He made his Super League debut on 23 June 2012, coming on as a substitute for Wang Gang in the 86th minute in a 3–1 home victory against Shanghai Shenxin. Often used as a squad player throughout his time at Shandong, he would go on to be loaned out to fellow top tier clubs in Guangzhou R&F on 5 January 2020 and Tianjin Jinmen on 12 April 2021.

On 29 April 2022, Li would join second tier second tier club Kunshan on a free transfer. He would make his debut in a league game on 13 June 2022 against Shaanxi Chang'an Athletic in a 0-0 draw. He would go on to establish himself as regular within the team that won the division and promotion to the top tier at the end of the 2022 China League One campaign.

International career
Li received his first called up for China U-20's squad by Su Maozhen in December 2010. He continued to play for China U-20 in the 2011 Granatkin Memorial, 2011 Toulon Tournament, 2011 Weifang Cup. He made 3 appearances in the 2012 AFC U-19 Championship qualification and was sent out in the last match which China lost to Australia U-20 3–0.

Career statistics 
Statistics accurate as of match played 31 December 2022.

Honours

Club
Shandong Luneng
Chinese FA Cup: 2014

Kunshan
China League One: 2022

References

External links
 

1993 births
Living people
Chinese footballers
Footballers from Jiangsu
Sportspeople from Xuzhou
Shandong Taishan F.C. players
Guangzhou City F.C. players
Chinese Super League players
China League Two players
Association football defenders
21st-century Chinese people